was a Japanese military physician.

After graduating Tokyo Imperial University, he joined the Japanese Medical Corps

He became Army Surgeon General of the Imperial Japanese Army in 1934.

He was the Minister of Health and Welfare from 1941 to 1944 under the Konoe and Tōjō cabinet. He worked positively to prevention of tuberculosis and advocated universal health care.

After the war, he came under suspicion of war crimes as a minister when the war broke. But Koizumi refused the investigation and committed suicide by seppuku.

Notes

1884 births
1945 deaths
People from Fukui Prefecture
University of Tokyo alumni
Japanese military doctors
Government ministers of Japan
Japanese military personnel who committed suicide
Seppuku from Meiji period to present
Japanese politicians who committed suicide
Suicides by sharp instrument in Japan
1945 suicides